Système Numérisé de Transmissions Intérieures, commonly known as SNTI, refers to an Integrated Shipboard Communication System (ISCS) developed for the French Navy in the 1970s and first deployed in the early 1980s for use in combat ships then nuclear submarines. For the first time, this system has been offering on board a full resilient communication system mixing digital Voice and Data thanks to its revolutionary loop or ring protection concept, that all civilian tecommunication networks have since adopted.

Background 
The SNTI project started by establishing ISCS requirements in early 1970. By 1972, the first multichannel single loop working model had been developed (SNTI 120 Channels) and by 1978, the French began a first generation development of SNTI for use on their Tripartite Mine Hunter (TMH) program. A second generation development began in 1979 and a system was functioning in 1980. Most of the French Navy ships have been equipped with this revolutionary communication system, including the French Charles De Gaulle Carrier in a latest version with multi channel multiple loops on optical cables (SNTI 240 ch. renamed "SGD"). It was also used on the Carl Vinson Carrier as a test-bed basis for the development of the current optical US navy ISCS systems.

The success of this SNTI technology has been residing on its concepts of survivability, security, immunity to Radiation Hazards (RADHAZ), maintenance, monitoring,  in the many combat or disaster situations.

Notes 
 Jump up ^ Bernard Pando, "Time sharing multiplex telecommunications system - has relief line in ring brought into service in opposite direction" From Patent database EPO - Patent N°FR2256605 priority 26 Dec 1973 by T.R.T company- 
 Jump up ^ French Ministry of Defence - Frigate combat equipment page on French Navy website (French) 

Military communications